The Plant Collections Network (PCN) (formerly the North American Plant Collections Consortium) is a group of North American botanical gardens and arboreta that coordinates a continent-wide approach to plant germplasm preservation, and promotes excellence in plant collections management. The program is administered by the American Public Gardens Association from its headquarters in Kennett Square, Pennsylvania in collaboration with the USDA- Agricultural Research Service.

Current objectives of the Plant Collections Network are to:

 Build Awareness – of both Plant Collections Network & value of documented plant collections
 Promote Standards of Excellence – in plant collections management; and 
 Expand Diversity of Collections – target existing collections, identify gaps for future collections

The network is intended to represent woody and herbaceous ornamentals, both native and exotic. The main objective for each network member is to assemble a comprehensive group of plants for a particular taxon, collecting plants from different populations throughout their natural range that are both taxonomically and genetically distinct.

Participating institutions maximize the potential value of their collections by making efficient use of available resources through a coordinated continent-wide approach, and strengthening their own collections through collaboration with others.

Criteria for participation in the Plant Collections Network are:

 American Public Gardens Association membership
 Active collections management program including plant records database, accession labels, maps
 Long-term commitment to maintain collection
 Endorsement of governing body
 Current collection has 50% or more of ultimate collection scope
 Collections policy
 Curator for collection; and
 Access to collection for research, evaluation and plant introduction

The accreditation process includes submitting a written application for each collection to be considered, then a peer site reviewer conducts an onsite assessment and submits a report with recommendations.

As of March 2016, Network participants and Nationally Accredited Plant Collections™ included:
 Arizona-Sonora Desert Museum
 Agavaceae - Sonoran Desert; 65 taxa
 Arboretum at Arizona State University
 Phoenix; 300 taxa, 40 varieties
 Arnold Arboretum of Harvard University
 Acer; multi-site
 Carya; 16 taxa, 11 spp
 Fagus; 26 taxa
 Stewartia; 11 taxa
 Syringa; 238 taxa, 20 spp
 Tsuga; 72 taxa, 7 spp
 Atlanta Botanical Garden
 Acer; 82 taxa
 Magnolia; multi-site
 Sarracenia; 78 taxa
 Bartlett Tree Research Laboratory and Arboretum
 Acer; multi-site
 Hamamelis; 161 taxa
 Magnolia; multi-site
 Quercus; multi-site
 Ulmus; 62 taxa
 Betty Ford Alpine Gardens
 Alpine Plants of Colorado; 87 taxa
 Boyce Thompson Arboretum
 Fabaceae - Desert Legumes; 1454 taxa as seeds, 206 taxa as plants
 Quercus; multi-site
 University of British Columbia Botanical Garden
 Acer; multi-site
 Magnolia; multi-site
 University of California Botanical Garden at Berkeley
 Cycads; multi-site
 Ferns; 360 taxa, with 500+ accessions
 Magnolia; multi-site
 Quercus; multi-site
 Cheekwood Botanical Garden
 Cornus; 61 taxa
 Chicago Botanic Garden
 Geranium; 102 taxa
 Quercus; 48 taxa
 Spiraea; 52 taxa
 Cornell Plantations
 Acer; multi-site
 Quercus; multi-site
 Donald E. Davis Arboretum
 Quercus; multi-site
 University of California Davis Arboretum
 Quercus; multi-site
 Dawes Arboretum
 Acer; multi-site
 Aesculus; 59 taxa
 Hamamelis; 75 taxa
 Metasequoia; 9 taxa, with 47 accessions of documented wild-origin, 8 cultivars
 Denver Botanic Gardens
 Alpine Plants of the World; 223 taxa
 Quercus; multi-site
 Desert Botanical Garden
 Agavaceae; 346 taxa
 Cactaceae; 1319 taxa
 The Arboretum at Flagstaff
 Penstemon (provisional) - Colorado Plateau, Arizona species; 37 taxa
 University of Florida- North Florida Research and Education Center
 Magnolia; multi-site
 Fort Worth Botanic Garden
 Begonia; 1001 taxa
 Fullerton Arboretum (California State University)
 Citrus; 36 accessions, representing 20 taxa
 Ganna Walska Lotusland
 Cycads; multi-site
 Green Spring Gardens Park
 Hamamelis; 80 taxa, including all 4 spp
 Henry Foundation for Botanical Research
 Magnolia; multi-site
 Highstead Arboretum
 Kalmia; 82 taxa, including 3 spp, 76 cultivars, 4 forms, 2 hybrids
 Holden Arboretum
 Quercus; multi-site
 Hoyt Arboretum
 Acer; multi-site
 Magnolia; multi-site
 The Huntington Botanical Gardens
 Camellia; 1240 taxa, including 40 spp, 1200 cultivars
 Huntsville Botanical Garden
 Trillium; 66 taxa, including 28 spp
 Idaho Botanical Garden
 Penstemon - Western US (provisional); 33 taxa
 Jenkins Arboretum
 Kalmia; 48 taxa
 Rhododendron; 1861 taxa
 Jensen-Olson Arboretum
 Primula; 65 taxa
 George Landis Arboretum
 Quercus of the Northeast U.S.; 14 taxa, 9 spp
 Springs Preserve
 Mojave Desert Cacti and Succulents; 28 taxa
 Longwood Gardens
 Nymphaea; 97 taxa
 Matthaei Botanical Gardens and Nichols Arboretum
 Paeonia; 317 taxa, with 467 plants 
 Mendocino Coast Botanical Gardens
 Heath and Heather; 134 taxa
 Minnesota Landscape Arboretum
 Grasses; 184 taxa
 Pinus; 60 taxa
 Missouri Botanical Garden
 Quercus; multi-site
 Montgomery Botanical Center
 Arecaceae; 356 taxa
 Cycads; multi-site
 Montreal Botanical Garden
 Rosa; 1097 taxa, including 115 spp
 Moore Farms Botanical Garden
 Magnolia; multi-site
 Morris Arboretum of the University of Pennsylvania
 Abies; 35 taxa, including cultivars
 Acer; multi-site
 Quercus; multi-site
 Morton Arboretum
 Acer; multi-site
 Magnolia; multi-site
 Malus; 185 taxa, 9 out of 10 known species, plus cultivars
 Quercus; multi-site
 Tilia; 45 taxa 
 Ulmus; 78 taxa, 35 spp, 43 hybrids and cultivars
 Mount Auburn Cemetery
 Quercus; multi-site
 Mt. Cuba Center
 Hexastylis; 39 taxa, including 10 spp
 Trillium; 84 taxa
 Naples Botanical Garden
 Plumeria; 585 taxa
 New England Wild Flower Society
 Trillium; 28 taxa
 New York Botanical Garden
 Acer; multi-site
 Quercus; multi-site
 Norfolk Botanical Garden
 Camellia; 525 taxa
 Hydrangea; 190 taxa
 Lagerstroemia; 75 taxa
 North Carolina Arboretum
 Rhododendron; 15 spp, native azaleas
 Phipps Conservatory and Botanical Gardens
 subfamily Cypripedioideae; 352 taxa
 Polly Hill Arboretum
 Stewartia; 19 taxa
 Powell Gardens
 Magnolia; multi-site
 Quarryhill Botanical Garden
 Acer; multi-site
 Magnolia (provisional)
 Rancho Santa Ana Botanic Garden
 Quercus; multi-site
 JC Raulston Arboretum
 Cercis; 40 taxa, including 7 spp, 33 cultivars
 Magnolia; multi-site
 Reiman Gardens at Iowa State University
 Griffith Buck Roses; 75 cultivars
 Rhododendron Species Foundation and Botanical Garden
 Rhododendron subsect. Fortunea; 15 taxa, with 104 accessions
 Rogerson Clematis Garden 
 Clematis ; 709 taxa
 San Diego Botanic Garden
 Bamboo; 121 taxa
 San Diego Zoo Global
 Cycads; multi-site
 Orchids; 907 taxa
 San Francisco Botanical Garden at Strybing Arboretum
 Arecaceae - high elevation; 107 taxa
 Magnolia; multi-site
 Mesoamerican Cloud Forest; 550 taxa, primarily from tropical mountains of southern Mexico and Central America
 Santa Barbara Botanic Garden
 Dudleya; 52 taxa
 Scott Arboretum of Swarthmore College
 Ilex; 312 taxa
 Magnolia; multi-site
 Quercus; multi-site
 Smithsonian Gardens
 Orchids - tropical species; 2400 accessions
 South Carolina Botanical Garden
 Magnolia; multi-site
 Starhill Forest Arboretum
 Quercus; multi-site
 Taltree Arboretum and Gardens
 Quercus; multi-site
 Toledo Botanical Garden
 Hosta; 495 taxa, including 43 spp, 452 cultivars, with 2500 accessions
 Tyler Arboretum
 Rhododendron; 529 taxa, with 1493 accessions
 United States National Arboretum
 Buxus; 190 taxa
 University of Washington Botanic Gardens
 Acer; multi-site
 Ilex; 47 taxa
 Magnolia; multi-site
 Quercus; multi-site
 VanDusen Botanical Garden
 Magnolia (provisional)

See also 
 List of botanical gardens and arboretums in the United States
 National Plant Collection – British plant collections program

References

External links 
 

Botanical gardens in the United States
Botanical societies
Flora of the United States
Plant conservation